William Bow (1878–1929) was a Scottish footballer who played in the Football League for Blackburn Rovers.

References

1878 births
1929 deaths
Scottish footballers
English Football League players
Association football forwards
St Bernard's F.C. players
Darwen F.C. players
Nelson F.C. players
Oswaldtwistle Rovers F.C. players
Great Harwood F.C. players